Ta mig till havet is a summertime-based song written by Peter Lundblad, and recorded by himself scoring a 1986 hit single. The song was also used as opening theme for the 1988 edition of Swedish summer vacation TV program Sommarlov.

The song is often sung at sing-along events in Sweden.

Other recordings
Recording the song, Curt Haagers charted with it at Svensktoppen for four weeks during the period of 16 November-7 December 1986, peaking at 6th position. Curt Haagers recording also became available on the 1986 album Curt Haagers -87.

References

1986 singles
Swedish-language songs
Curt Haagers songs